Tom Ramshaw (born November 18, 1991 in Toronto, Ontario) is a Canadian sailor in the Finn class. Ramshaw qualified to compete at the 2016 Summer Olympics.

Ramshaw was originally a Laser competitor but later made the move to the finn class in the summer of 2015.

He represented Canada at the 2020 Summer Olympics.

References

External links
 Official website
 

1991 births
Living people
Canadian male sailors (sport)
Sportspeople from Toronto
Finn class sailors
Olympic sailors of Canada
Sailors at the 2016 Summer Olympics – Finn
Sailors at the 2020 Summer Olympics – Finn